The list of ship commissionings in 1960 includes a chronological list of all ships commissioned in 1960.


References

See also 

1960
 Ship commissionings